is a Japanese composer, arranger, music producer, pianist and keyboardist.

Biography 
Conisch was born on April 19, 1981. He graduated from Waseda Jitsugyo High School, and attended the Toho Gakuen School of Music where he partially completed a program in composition.

Discography

Anime works

References

External links 
  
 
 

1981 births
Anime composers
Japanese composers
Japanese keyboardists
Japanese male composers
Japanese male pianists
Japanese music arrangers
Japanese pianists
Japanese record producers
Living people